Raúl Kaplún (November 11, 1910 - January 23, 1990) (born Israel Kaflún) was a well-known tango violinist, director and composer.

Biography 

Raúl Kaplún was born in Balvanera, Buenos Aires to an itinerant Jewish hat salesman Leiser Finkel who had immigrated to Argentina from Bessarabia.

Kaplun was sent to the cheder of the synagogue on Paso Street, as well as to study the violin from Marcos Sadoski. He later studied with José Fraga and later with the prestigious German .

He was the author of Que solo estoy, Canción de rango, Una emoción and Solitario.

Kaplun refused to join the Peronist party, and as a result his band was barred from the radio.

He was one of a group of prominent Jewish tango musicians, including Szymsia Bajour, Carlos Aguirre, Julio Jorge Nelson and Ismael Spitalnik.

References 

 Julio Nudler,Tango judío. Del ghetto a la milonga, Editorial Sudamericana, Buenos Aires 1998.
 Ricardo Feierstein, Historia de los judíos argentinos, Editorial Galerna, Buenos Aires, 2006
 From Tejano to Tango: Essays on Latin American Popular Music edited by Walter Aaron Clark, 2002
 Biography
 Biography
 Video of Kaplun Orchestra
 Video of Kaplun Orchestra
 Video of Kaplun Orchestra playing 'Tierra Querida'

Argentine tango musicians
Jewish Argentine musicians
Argentine people of Polish-Jewish descent
1910 births
1990 deaths
20th-century violinists

Tango musicians
Argentine violinists
Jewish violinists